Rodolfo Fernández Marín (June 27, 1911 – September 6, 2000) was a Cuban pitcher in the American Negro leagues in the 1930s and 1940s. 

A native of Guanabacoa, Cuba, Fernández was the brother of fellow Negro leaguer José Fernández. Younger brother Rudy broke into the Negro leagues in 1932 with the Cuban Stars (East), and pitched for over a decade, ending his career with the New York Black Yankees in 1946. He tossed shutout wins against both the New York Giants and Brooklyn Dodgers in exhibition games in Havana. Fernández died in New York, New York in 2000 at age 89.

References

External links
 and Baseball-Reference Black Baseball stats and Seamheads
 Rodolfo 'Rudy' Fernandez at NLBPA Profile

1911 births
2000 deaths
Cuban Stars (East) players
New York Black Yankees players
New York Cubans players
Cuban expatriate baseball players in Nicaragua
Baseball pitchers
Baseball players from Havana
Cuban expatriate baseball players in the United States